Luka Gagnidze (born 28 February 2003) is a Georgian professional footballer who plays as a central midfielder for Russian club FC Dynamo Moscow.

Club career
On 5 July 2021, Gagnidze signed a five-year contract with Russian Premier League club FC Dynamo Moscow On 21 July 2021, he was loaned to another RPL club FC Ural Yekaterinburg for the 2021–22 season.

He made his debut in the Russian Premier League for Ural on 1 August 2021 in a game against FC Nizhny Novgorod. He substituted Vyacheslav Podberyozkin in the 58th minute.

On 10 March 2022, Gagnidze's contract with Ural was suspended until 30 June 2022 (which is the end of his loan term) according to special FIFA regulations related to the Russian invasion of Ukraine.

On 25 March 2022, he signed a short-term deal with Polish Ekstraklasa side Raków Częstochowa.

Career statistics

References

External links
 
 
 

2003 births
Footballers from Tbilisi
Living people
Footballers from Georgia (country)
Georgia (country) youth international footballers
Association football midfielders
FC Dinamo Tbilisi players
FC Dynamo Moscow players
FC Ural Yekaterinburg players
Raków Częstochowa players
Erovnuli Liga players
Russian Premier League players
Ekstraklasa players
Expatriate footballers from Georgia (country)
Expatriate footballers in Russia
Expatriate sportspeople from Georgia (country) in Russia
Expatriate footballers in Poland
Expatriate sportspeople from Georgia (country) in Poland